Pyramidanthe is a monotypic genus of flowering plants belonging to the family Annonaceae. The only species is Pyramidanthe prismatica.

Its native range is Western Malesia.

References

Annonaceae
Annonaceae genera
Monotypic magnoliid genera